Iridana obscura is a butterfly in the family Lycaenidae. It is found in Uganda (from the western part of the country to the Toro sub-region).

References

Endemic fauna of Uganda
Butterflies described in 1964
Poritiinae